The Alaska Maritime National Wildlife Refuge (often shortened to Alaska Maritime or AMNWR) is a United States National Wildlife Refuge comprising 2,400 islands, headlands, rocks, islets, spires and reefs in Alaska, with a total area of , of which  is wilderness. The refuge stretches from Cape Lisburne on the Chukchi Sea to the tip of the Aleutian Islands in the west and Forrester Island in the southern Alaska Panhandle region in the east. The refuge has diverse landforms and terrains, including tundra, rainforest, cliffs, volcanoes, beaches, lakes, and streams.

Alaska Maritime National Wildlife Refuge is well known for its abundance of seabirds. About 75 percent of Alaskan native marine birds, 15 to 30 million among 55 species, use the refuge. AMNWR also provides a nesting habitat for an estimated 40 million seabirds, representing 80 percent of all seabirds in North America. The birds congregate in "bird cities" (colonies) along the coast. Each species has a specialized nesting site (rock ledge, crevice, boulder rubble, pinnacle, or burrow). Other animals present in this refuge include caribou, sea lions, bears, coyotes, seals, Canada lynx, beavers, foxes, muskrats, wolf packs, moose, walrus, river otters, marten, whales, Dall sheep and sea otters.

The administrative headquarters and visitor center are located in Homer, Alaska. In 1968, Simeonof National Wildlife Refuge, part of the Alaska Maritime National Wildlife Refuge, was designated as a National Natural Landmark by the National Park Service.

Administration
The refuge is divided into five units. Clockwise around Alaska, starting in the southeast, their component territories include:

Gulf of Alaska unit
 Saint Lazaria Wilderness (formerly Saint Lazaria National Wildlife Refuge) (Saint Lazaria Island)
 Hazy Islands Wilderness (Hazy Islands)
 Forrester Island Wilderness (Forrester Island, Lowrie Island, Wolf Rock)
 Barren Islands (East Amatuli Island, West Amatuli Island, Ushagat Island, et al.)
 Tuxedni Wilderness (Chisik Island, Duck Island, and Egg Island)
 Middleton Island
 Chiswell Islands
 Trinity Island (Sitkinak Island)

Alaska Peninsula unit
 Sutwik Island
 Semidi Wilderness (Semidi Islands: Aghik Island and Chowiet Island, et al.)
 Simeonof Wilderness (Simeonof Island, part of the Shumagin Islands)

Aleutian Islands unit

Includes most of the land area of the Aleutian Islands, from Unimak in the east to Attu in the west
 Unimak Wilderness (Unimak Island)
 Aleutian Islands Wilderness
 Bogoslof Wilderness (Bogoslof Island)

Bering Sea unit

 Hagemeister Island
 Pribilof Islands (St. George Island, St. Paul Island, Otter Island, Walrus Island)
 Bering Sea Wilderness (St. Matthew Island, Hall Island, Pinnacle Island)
 Besboro Island
 Sledge Island
 King Island

Chukchi Sea unit
 Chamisso Wilderness (Chamisso Island, Puffin Island)
 Cape Thompson
 Cape Lisburne

Gallery

See also
 United States Fish and Wildlife Service
 Saint Lazaria National Wildlife Refuge

References

External links

 
 Islands and Oceans Visitor Center, the official visitor center for the Refuge
 AMNWR field camp photos Unofficial site
 

 
Chukchi Sea
Homer, Alaska
Protected areas of Aleutians East Borough, Alaska
Protected areas of Kenai Peninsula Borough, Alaska
Protected areas of Kodiak Island Borough, Alaska
Protected areas of Lake and Peninsula Borough, Alaska
Protected areas of Northwest Arctic Borough, Alaska
Protected areas of Sitka, Alaska
National Natural Landmarks in Alaska